The bare-eyed white-eye (Zosterops superciliosus) is a species of bird in the family Zosteropidae. It is endemic to Rennell Island in the Solomon Islands.

References

Further reading

bare-eyed white-eye
Birds of Rennell Island
bare-eyed white-eye
Taxa named by Alfred John North
Taxonomy articles created by Polbot